Kizil Su, Kyzylsu or Kyzyl-Suu,  may refer to the following locations:

Kizilsu Kyrgyz Autonomous Prefecture, Xinjiang, China
Kyzyl-Suu, Kyrgyzstan, a village in Kyrgyzstan
Kyzyl-Su, a former name of the city Türkmenbaşy in Turkmenistan
Kyzylsu (Panj), a river in Tajikistan, tributary of the Panj
Kyzyl-Suu, the name of the upper course of the river Vakhsh in Kyrgyzstan
Kyzyl-Suu, the name of the upper course of the river Kashgar in Kyrgyzstan